Dineshwar Sharma (23 March 1954 – 4 December 2020) was an Indian police officer. He was the chief of the Indian Intelligence Bureau (succeeded by Rajiv Jain), that is the Director of Intelligence Bureau which is the highest-ranked post in the Indian Police Service (IPS). He also served as an interlocutor to the government of India for the state of Jammu and Kashmir. He served as the 34th Administrator of Lakshadweep from 2019 until his death.

Background 
Born in Bihar, he gained primary education in Pali, Bihar, and later graduated from Magadh University, Bodh Gaya. A third-generation policeman, Sharma first qualified for Indian Forest Service (IFS) and later for IPS.

Career 

He worked continuously in the IB after 2008. He attended training on intelligence work and policing methods in East Germany, Poland, Israel and South Korea. He served in Nagaland, Jammu and Kashmir, Gujarat and Rajasthan in various capacities in BSF, CRPF and IB. He also worked with National Security Adviser (NSA) Ajit Doval during his earlier stint as IB chief. He was fluent in Hindi, English, Maithili, Malayalam, Tamil, Arabic, and Urdu.

References

|-

|-

Indian police officers
Spymasters
Indian spies
1952 births
2020 deaths
Indian police chiefs
Directors of Intelligence Bureau (India)
People from Bihar
Administrators of Lakshadweep
Deaths from the COVID-19 pandemic in India